Iluminado Davila Medina (July 1, 1918 – June 7, 2021) was a Puerto Rican musician. He was a cuatrista.

Biography
Davila Medina was born in Morovis, Puerto Rico, the son of Jose Davila Ortega, also a cuatro musician, and Joaquina Medina Guzman. He had two sisters, older sister Elisa and younger sister Josefa, and a brother, Juan, who was older than him by one year. At the age of 17, he began listening to a radio show on WKAQ radio. About 1945, Davila Medina was living in Vega Alta, a northern city in Puerto Rico near the country's capital of San Juan, when he decided to travel to San Juan and meet the musicians on that show, namely Leocadio Vizcarrondo, Samuel Archilla, Felipe Goyco and three other musicians who formed a popular, Puerto Rican radio music band of the time.

Davila Medina and his friends once had a band named "Grupo Idilio", which performed serenatas around Morovis. At age 18, he was also a member of "Grupo Orion". Around 1956, he joined a radio show named "Onda Morobena" (sic) in Arecibo, where he and his band played for three years. Davila Medina played lead and secondary cuatro at that time.

Davila Medina married a woman named Gladys; the marriage lasted 70 years until her death and produced two sons and one daughter; both sons preceded him in death. One of them, "Junior", once joined Iluminado on a band that Iluminado created in 1983, "Conjunto Tipico Moroveno".

Davila Medina continued playing the cuatro well into his old age; during his 90s, he was still playing the cuatro on other artists' albums as well as on compilation albums.

He died on June 7, 2021 at the age of 102.

Honors
On May 12, 2011, Puerto Rican governor Luis Fortuno inaugurated the Centro de Bellas Artes Iluminado Davila Medina in Morovis, a theater and musical structure that, since 2019, has a mosaic depicting its namesake, reminiscent of the one dedicated to basketball player Mario Morales at the Mario Morales Coliseum in Guaynabo, another large Puerto Rican city.

Later on, the Puerto Rican Senate released a resolution on April 18, 2018, congratulating Davila Medina for his musical career and for him being about to turn 100 years old.

See also
List of Puerto Ricans

External links

1918 births
2021 deaths
Puerto Rican musicians
People from Morovis, Puerto Rico
Puerto Rican centenarians
Men centenarians